Mehdi Nebbou (born 10 January 1974) is a French actor.

Biography
Nebbou was born on 10 January 1974 in Bayonne, Pyrénées-Atlantiques, France, to a German mother and an Algerian father. His brother is the film director Safy Nebbou.

He started his career by appearing in the film My Sweet Home, directed by Filipos Tsitos.

In 2004, the director Samir Nasr offered him the leading role in the film Seeds of Doubt, which won the Golden Gate Award for best film at the San Francisco Film Festival. 2005 was a turning point in Nebbou's career thanks to the film Schläfer by German film director Benjamin Heisenberg. The film received excellent reviews and was selected for the 2005 Cannes Film Festival.

In 2006, he portrayed Ali Hassan Salameh in the Steven Spielberg blockbuster film Munich.

In 2007, for his performance in Teresas Zimmer, directed by German film director Constanze Knoche, he won the award for best actor at First Steps Awards.

In 2008, Nebbou worked in the Ridley Scott film Body of Lies with Leonardo DiCaprio. In it, he portrayed Nizar, an Iraqi linguistics doctorate turned Al-Qaeda operative who approaches CIA to defect after being enlisted by his jihadist superiors for suicide bombing. In addition, he played in several French TV series and films, among them as a disabled ex-middleweight boxing world champion in Douce France for which he won the award for best actor in 2009 at the Rochelle TV Festival. He played Mustafa Larbi, a sadistic and unpredictable drug dealer, in Season 2 of Spiral, the successful Canal+ TV series.

In 2010, he portrayed Bruno in the Salvatore Allocca Italian romantic comedy Come trovare nel modo giusto l'uomo sbagliato and in 2011, Amin in the French action film Forces spéciales with Diane Krüger.

In 2012, he had his breakthrough into the Indian film industry thanks to the film English Vinglish starring Sridevi.

He portrayed the lead in Les heures souterraines directed by Philippe Harel inspired by the novel of Delphine de Vigan in 2014.

In 2015 and 2016, he is Cyclone in 6 episodes of season 1 and 2 of Le Bureau des Légendes.

In 2016, he is the co-lead in the Romanian movie The Fixer directed by Adrian Sitaru about human traffic in Europe and under-age prostitution. The film is pre-selected for the Oscars 2018.

In 2017, he is one of the leads in the second seasons of the Norwegian cult series Occupied and in the German series Deutschland 86.

He will be one of the leads in the new Netflix series Baby directed by Andrea De Sica and Anna Negri.

In 2021, he is portraying a middile-east investor in the movie "House of Gucci" de Ridley Scott.

He is fluent in French, German, English and Italian.

Filmography

References

External links

1974 births
Living people
20th-century French male actors
21st-century French male actors
French male film actors
French male television actors
French people of Algerian descent
French people of German descent
People from Bayonne